

The Alba Carolina Citadel is a star-shaped fortress located in Alba Iulia. Its construction commenced on November 4, 1715 during the Habsburg rule in Transylvania, and was completed in 1738. 20,000 serfs were involved in its construction, which is estimated to have cost around 3 million florins. The citadel was built on the site of two other fortifications: the legionary fortress of Legio XIII Gemina (known as Apulum), as well as the medieval Belgrad citadel.

The shape of the citadel, an iconic element of Vauban architecture, influenced the design of Alba Iulia's city logo when the city adopted city branding in 2014. The city received 47.5 million lei in 2009 for the restoration and conservation of the citadel.

The citadel is named after Charles VI, known as Carol VI in Romanian, who was the Holy Roman Emperor at the time of the citadel's construction.

See also
 Seven Wonders of Romania

References

Further reading

External links 

 Alba Iulia Citadel

Buildings and structures in Alba Iulia
Forts in Romania
18th-century establishments in Romania
Historic monuments in Alba County
18th-century architecture in Romania